Ragnar Holmstedt was a Swedish footballer.

References

Swedish footballers
Allsvenskan players
Malmö FF players
Living people
Association footballers not categorized by position
Year of birth missing (living people)